Raimonda Kudytė (born 10 October 1975) is a Lithuanian former footballer who played as a midfielder. She has been a member of the Lithuania women's national team.

References

1975 births
Living people
Women's association football midfielders
Lithuanian women's footballers
Lithuania women's international footballers
Gintra Universitetas players
Lithuanian expatriate footballers
Lithuanian expatriate sportspeople in Ukraine
Expatriate women's footballers in Ukraine
WFC Zhytlobud-1 Kharkiv players